Claudir Marini Júnior (born 6 August 6 1992) is a Brazilian footballer who plays as a forward.

Career
On 19 September 2020, Claudir returned to the Armenian Premier League, signing for Lori on a one-year contract, with the option of an additional year.

On 17 June 2021, Claudir signed for Sevan.

Career statistics

Club

References

1992 births
Living people
Brazilian footballers
Associação Atlética Flamengo players
Olaria Atlético Clube players
Sport Club Corinthians Paulista players
Londrina Esporte Clube players
Guaratinguetá Futebol players
Clube Atlético Sorocaba players
Sport Club São Paulo players
FC Gandzasar Kapan players
Esteghlal Khuzestan F.C. players
Shahr Khodro F.C. players
PSIS Semarang players
Hapoel Ramat Gan F.C. players
FC Lori players
Brazilian expatriate footballers
Expatriate footballers in Armenia
Expatriate footballers in Iran
Expatriate footballers in Indonesia
Expatriate footballers in Israel
Brazilian expatriate sportspeople in Armenia
Brazilian expatriate sportspeople in Iran
Brazilian expatriate sportspeople in Indonesia
Brazilian expatriate sportspeople in Israel
Persian Gulf Pro League players
Liga Leumit players
Armenian Premier League players
Association football forwards
People from Campo Grande
Sportspeople from Mato Grosso do Sul